Checca may refer to:
 Checca sauce
 Checca, Peru